Solomon Agbesi (born 13 October 2000) is a Ghanaian professional footballer who plays as a goalkeeper for Ghanaian Premier League side Dreams F.C.

Career 
In October 2019, Agbesi was signed by Ghana Premier League side Dreams FC  ahead of the 2019–20 Ghana Premier League season and was named on the squad list for the season. He was named on the match day squad list as he made the bench for the 4–1 victory over King Faisal Babes on 29 December 2019. He made the bench for 8 matches but did not make his debut before the league was truncated due to the COVID-19 pandemic.

Ahead of the 2020–21 Ghana Premier League season, he was named on the team's squad list as the league was set to restart in November 2020. On 16 November 2020, he made his debut, keeping a clean sheet in a goalless draw against International Allies.

References

External links 

 

Living people
2000 births
Association football goalkeepers
Ghanaian footballers
Dreams F.C. (Ghana) players
Ghana Premier League players